Arithmetic of a Murder is a 1991 Soviet crime film directed by Dmitry Svetozarov.

Plot 
In a communal apartment in St. Petersburg, a bully, whom everyone hated, was killed. Despite the fact that everyone had a motive for the murder, they all had an alibi. A local disabled person is trying to help the investigator solve the murder.

Cast 
 Sergey Bekhterev
 Zinaida Sharko
 Yury Kuznetsov
 Lev Borisov
 Olga Samoshina
 Vladimir Kashpur
 Slava N. Jakovleff

References

External links 
 

1991 films
1990s Russian-language films
Soviet crime films
1991 crime films